Broşteni may refer to several places in Romania:

 Broșteni, Suceava
 Broșteni, Mehedinți
 Broșteni, Vrancea
 Broșteni, a village in Aninoasa, Argeș
 Broșteni, a village in Durnești Commune, Botoşani County
 Broșteni, a village in Bezdead Commune, Dâmboviţa County
 Broşteni, a village in Produlești Commune, Dâmboviţa County
 Broşteni, a village in Vișina, Dâmbovița Commune, Dâmbovița County
 Broşteni and Broştenii de Sus, villages in Plopșoru Commune, Gorj County
 Broşteni, a village in Ion Roată, Ialomița
 Broşteni, a village in Vlădeni, Iași
 Broşteni, a village in Bahna Commune, Neamţ County
 Broşteni, a village in Găvănești Commune, Olt County
 Broşteni, a village in Păuca Commune, Sibiu County
 Broşteni, a village in Drăguşeni, Suceava
 Broşteni, a village in Ivănești Commune, Vaslui County
 Broşteni, a village in Lăpușata Commune, Vâlcea County
 Broşteni, a district in the town of Costeşti, Argeș County
 Broşteni, a district in the town of Oraviţa, Caraş-Severin County
 Perii Broşteni, a village in Olteni Commune, Teleorman County

and to:
 Broşteni, a commune in Transnistria, Moldova